Camillo Pilotto (6 February 1888 – 27 May 1963) was an Italian film actor. He appeared in 101 films between 1916 and 1963. He was born and died in Rome, Italy.

Selected filmography

 The Song of Love (1930)
 The Old Lady (1932)
 Five to Nil (1932)
 The Telephone Operator (1932)
 Three Lucky Fools (1933)
 The Haller Case (1933)
 La segretaria per tutti (1933)
 Port (1934)
 The Matchmaker (1934)
 Full Speed (1934)
 Sette giorni all'altro mondo (1936)
 The Great Appeal (1936)
 The Anonymous Roylott (1936)
 Scipio Africanus: The Defeat of Hannibal (1937)
 The Last Days of Pompeo (1937)
 The Make Believe Pirates (1937)
 The Three Wishes (1937)
 The Two Misanthropists (1937)
The Castiglioni Brothers, (1937)
 Pietro Micca (1938)
 Giuseppe Verdi (1938)
 All of Life in One Night (1938)
 The Count of Brechard (1938)
 Cardinal Messias (1939)
 Backstage (1939)
 The Sons of the Marquis Lucera (1939)
 Beyond Love (1940)
 The Sinner (1940)
 The Daughter of the Green Pirate (1940)
 Abandonment (1940)
 The Secret Lover (1941)
 The Adventuress from the Floor Above (1941)
 The Gorgon (1942)
 A Living Statue (1943)
 A Little Wife (1943)
 Redemption (1943)
 The Innkeeper (1944)
 Fury (1947)
 Bullet for Stefano (1947)
 The Courier of the King (1947)
 Alina (1950)
 Cavalcade of Heroes (1950)
 Mistress of the Mountains (1950)
 Pact with the Devil (1950)
 The Last Days of Pompeii (1950)
 Abbiamo vinto! (1951)
 Without a Flag (1951)
 Messalina (1951)
 Black Feathers (1952)
 Giovinezza (1952)
 The Three Thieves (1954)
 Schiava del peccato (1954)
 Casta Diva (1954)
 The Prince with the Red Mask (1955)
 The Goddess of Love (1957)
 Head of a Tyrant (1959)

References

External links

1888 births
1963 deaths
Italian male film actors
Italian male silent film actors
Male actors from Rome
20th-century Italian male actors